Eugene is an unincorporated area in Dixie County, Florida. The Florida State Road Department rendered Eugene on a 1936 road map. A 1967 state geology report noted Pamlico Dune near Eugene on U.S. Highway 27. Eugene is south of Cross City and North of Old Town, Florida on U.S. Route 98 in Florida. The Nature Coast State Trail also passes by.

References

Unincorporated communities in Dixie County, Florida